Dominic Salvatore "Don" Gentile (December 6, 1920 – January 28, 1951), also known as "Ace of Aces", was a World War II USAAF pilot who surpassed Eddie Rickenbacker's World War I record of 26 downed aircraft.  He later served in the post-war U.S. Air Force.

Early life
Gentile was born in Piqua, Ohio, the son of Italian immigrants Patsy and Josephina Gentile, who immigrated in 1907. After a fascination with flying as a child, his father provided him with his own plane, an Aerosport Biplane. He managed to log over 300 hours flying time by July 1941, when he attempted to join the Army Air Forces.

Royal Canadian Air Force
The U.S. military required two years of college for its pilots, which Gentile did not have, so he enlisted in the Royal Canadian Air Force and was posted to the UK in 1941. Gentile flew  the Supermarine Spitfire Mark V with No. 133 Squadron, one of the famed "Eagle Squadron" during 1942. His first kills (a Ju 88 and Fw 190) were on August 19, 1942, during Operation Jubilee.

4th Fighter Group
In September 1942, the Eagle squadrons transferred to the USAAF, becoming the 4th Fighter Group. Gentile became a flight commander in September 1943, now flying the P-47 Thunderbolt. Having been Spitfire pilots, Gentile and the other pilots of the 4th were displeased when they transitioned to the heavy P-47. On 16 December 1943 Gentile claimed a third-share destroyed Ju-88. On 5 January 1944, he claimed a Fw-190 west of Tours. Two Fw-190s were claimed on 14 January and a single 190 on 25 February.

By late 1943, Group Commander Col. Don Blakeslee pushed for re-equipment with the lighter, more maneuverable P-51 Mustang. Conversion to the P-51B at the end of February 1944 allowed Gentile to build a tally of 15.5 additional aircraft destroyed between March 3 and April 8, 1944.

His first victory flying the P-51 was on 3 March, when he claimed a Do 217 in the Wittemburg area.

After downing three more planes on April 8, he was the top scoring 8th Air Force ace when he crashed his personal P-51, named "Shangri La", on April 13, 1944, while stunting over the 4th FG's airfield at Debden for a group of assembled press reporters and movie cameras. Blakeslee immediately grounded Gentile as a result, and he was sent back to the US for a tour selling war bonds. In 1944, Gentile co-wrote with well-known war correspondent Ira Wolfert One Man Air Force, an autobiography and account of his combat missions.

His final tally of credits was 29.83 aerial victories and 3 damaged,  with 6 ground kills, in 350 combat hours flown. He also claimed two victories while with the RAF.

Note in the accompanying color photograph, that the shroud, normally surrounding the six exhausts for smoother air flow, has been removed. This was a common practice for pilots in "the heat" of combat, where any extra cooling to the engine was helpful towards performance.

Together with his wingman John T. Godfrey, they were known as 'Captains Courageous', 'The Two Man Air Force', 'Messerschmitt Killers', or 'Damon and Pythias'.

Post war
After the war, he stayed with the Air Force, as a test pilot at Wright Field, as a Training Officer in the Fighter Gunnery Program, and as a student officer at the Air Tactical School. In June 1949, Gentile enrolled as an undergraduate studying military science at the University of Maryland.

Death
On January 28, 1951, he was killed when he crashed in a T-33A-1-LO Shooting Star trainer, AF Ser. No. 49-0905, in Forestville, Maryland, leaving behind his wife Isabella Masdea Gentile Beitman (deceased October 2008), and sons Don Jr., Joseph and Pasquale.

Gentile was buried with full military honors in Saint Joseph Cemetery in Lockbourne, Ohio.

Awards and decorations
Gentile's awards and decorations include:

Distinguished Service Cross citation (1st Award)

Gentile, Dominic S.
Captain (Air Corps), U.S. Army Air Forces
336th Fighter Squadron, 4th Fighter Group, 8th Air Force
Date of Action:  March 08, 1944

Citation:

The President of the United States of America, authorized by Act of Congress, July 9, 1918, takes pleasure in presenting the Distinguished Service Cross to Captain (Air Corps) Dominic "Don" Salvatore Gentile, United States Army Air Forces, for extraordinary heroism in connection with military operations against an armed enemy while serving as Pilot of a P-51 Fighter Airplane in the 336th Fighter Squadron, 4th Fighter Group, Eighth Air Force, in aerial combat against enemy forces on 8 March 1944, in the European Theater of Operations. On this date Captain Gentile, while leading a section of Fighter Aircraft on a bomber escort mission to targets in the vicinity of Berlin, Germany, saw a flight of bombers being attacked by approximately fifty enemy fighters. With only his wing man as support and without regard to the overwhelming odds against him, Captain Gentile immediately attacked the enemy formation and by extremely courageous flying and skillful gunnery destroyed three enemy planes and broke up the threat against the bombers. Continuing with his wing man, they destroyed three more enemy fighters. By this time the wing man had expended his ammunition and Captain Gentile's supply was very low. Despite this fact, they picked up a straggling bomber and escorted it to friendly territory. Captain Gentile's outstanding courage and determination to destroy the enemy on this occasion set an example of heroism which will be an inspiration to the Armed Forces of the United States.

Distinguished Service Cross citation (2nd Award)

Gentile, Dominic S.
Captain (Air Corps), U.S. Army Air Forces
336th Fighter Squadron, 4th Fighter Group, 8th Air Force
Date of Action:  April 8, 1944

Citation:

The President of the United States of America, authorized by Act of Congress July 9, 1918, takes pleasure in presenting a Bronze Oak Leaf Cluster in lieu of a Second Award of the Distinguished Service Cross to Captain (Air Corps) Dominic "Don" Salvatore Gentile, United States Army Air Forces, for extraordinary heroism in connection with military operations against an armed enemy while serving as Pilot of a P-51 Fighter Airplane in the 336th Fighter Squadron, 4th Fighter Group, Eighth Air Force, in aerial combat against enemy forces on April 8, 1944. On this date Captain Gentile destroyed three enemy fighters and assisted in destruction of a fourth in a single engagement. Captain Gentile's unquestionable valor in aerial combat is in keeping with the highest traditions of the military service and reflects great credit upon himself, the 8th Air Force, and the United States Army Air Forces.

Legacy
A Civil Air Patrol squadron based in Sidney, Ohio was named in honor of Don Gentile.

On Independence Day Weekend (July 6) 1986, a statue of Don Gentile (pictured) was dedicated in his hometown Piqua Ohio.

Gentile Air Force Station in Kettering, Ohio was named in his honor in 1962. The installation closed in 1996.

Winston Churchill called Gentile and his wingman, Captain John T. Godfrey, Damon and Pythias, after the legendary characters from Greek mythology. He was inducted into the National Aviation Hall of Fame in 1995.

References

 4 volumes–I: Terror from the Sky (pages 1–168), II: Tragic Victories (pages 1–192), III: Outraged Skies (pages 1–136), IV: Wings of Fire (pages 1–218)

External links
Don Gentile at acesofww2.com
4th Fighter Group WWII Official WWII Association Website

1920 births
1951 deaths
Accidental deaths in Maryland
American people of Italian descent
American World War II flying aces
Aviators from Ohio
Aviators killed in aviation accidents or incidents in the United States
National Aviation Hall of Fame inductees
Military personnel from Dayton, Ohio
People from Piqua, Ohio
Recipients of the Distinguished Flying Cross (United States)
Recipients of the Distinguished Service Cross (United States)
Recipients of the Distinguished Flying Cross (United Kingdom)
Recipients of the Silver Star
Recipients of the Air Medal
United States Air Force officers
United States Army Air Forces officers
United States Army Air Forces pilots of World War II
Victims of aviation accidents or incidents in 1951
Recipients of the Croix de guerre (Belgium)